Farooq Shah (born on 19 October 1985) is a Pakistani footballer, who plays for as a striker for National Bank.

Shah plays as a midfielder and striker. He earned his first international cap during the Indo-Pak series in 2005 and scored his first goal in the 2008 AFC Challenge Cup qualifiers.

He is well known for his short stature and immense work-rate on the pitch, as well as his eccentric hair styles which has made him a fans favourite.

International Career Stats

Goals for Senior National Team

Honours

With Pakistan national football team
South Asian Games Gold 2004, 2006

References

1985 births
Living people
Pakistani footballers
Pakistan international footballers
Association football midfielders
South Asian Games gold medalists for Pakistan
South Asian Games medalists in football
NBP F.C. players